HD 222806 (HR 8995) is a suspected astrometric binary in the southern circumpolar constellation Octans. It has an apparent magnitude of 5.74, allowing it to be faintly seen with the naked eye.

The visible component has a stellar classification of K1 III, indicating that it is a red giant. At present it has 126% the mass of the Sun, but has expanded to almost 19 times its girth. HD 222806 is metal enriched with an iron abundance over twice that of the Sun and is believed to be a member of the young disk population.

References

Octans
K-type giants
Astrometric binaries
Octantis, 85
222806
117125
8995
PD-79 1239